Bernard "Ben" Staartjes (9 December 1928, Amsterdam – 17 March 2014, Kapellen)  was a sailor from the Netherlands, who represented his country at the 1972 Summer Olympics in Kiel, Germany. With crew Cees Kurpershoek he took the 5th place in the Tempest. In 1976 Staartjes represent the Netherlands again in the Tempest. This time with crew Ab Ekels They took 8th place. Later Staartjes specialized in the Star.

In 1980 Staartjes was Chef de Equipe of the Dutch Olympic Sailing Team at the 1980 Summer Olympics in Tallinn. This was the first time, and so far the only time, the Netherlands was represented at all Olympic Sailing events.

Controversy
Several countries did boycott the 1980 Summer Olympics, others like France did not go since they found the competition devaluated. As result only half of the expected fleet was present during the Olympic regattas. It was the effort of Staartjes and Geert Bakker that the Dutch Olympic Sailing Team went to Tallinn.

Sources

References

1928 births
2014 deaths
Sportspeople from Amsterdam
Dutch male sailors (sport)
Star class sailors
Soling class sailors
Sailors at the 1972 Summer Olympics – Tempest
Sailors at the 1976 Summer Olympics – Tempest
Olympic sailors of the Netherlands
Dutch referees and umpires
20th-century Dutch people